Hi Fi Party is an album by saxophonist James Moody recorded in 1955 and released on the Prestige label. The CD reissue added a bonus track which originally appeared on James Moody's Moods.

Reception

Scott Yanow, in a review for AllMusic, stated: "For a period in the mid-'50s, tenor saxophonist James Moody (who doubled on alto) was able to keep together a swinging septet that played bop in a fairly accessible way".

Track listing 
 "There Will Never Be Another You" (Mack Gordon, Harry Warren) - 3:49  
 "Hard to Get" (Jack Segal) - 4:03  
 "Disappointed" (Eddie Jefferson) - 6:19  
 "Big Ben"  (Benny Golson) - 4:16  
 "Show Eyes" (John Adriano Acea) - 4:22  
 "Little John" (John Latham) - 4:20 
 "And You Called My Name" (Golson) - 4:10  
 "Little Ricky" (Acea) - 3:54   
 "Jammin' with James"  (Dave Burns, James Moody) - 11:36 Bonus track on CD reissue

Personnel 
James Moody - tenor saxophone, alto saxophone
Dave Burns - trumpet
William Shepherd - trombone
Pee Wee Moore - baritone saxophone 
Jimmy Boyd - piano
John Latham - bass
Clarence Johnston - drums
Eddie Jefferson - vocal (out chorus track 3)

Production
Bob Weinstock - supervisor
Rudy Van Gelder - engineer

References 

James Moody (saxophonist) albums
1956 albums
Prestige Records albums
Albums produced by Bob Weinstock
Albums recorded at Van Gelder Studio